Nelson Mandela International Airport , also known as Praia International Airport, is the airport of Santiago Island in Cape Verde. It was opened in October 2005, replacing the old Francisco Mendes International Airport. It is located about 3 km northeast of the city centre of Praia in the southeastern part of the island of Santiago.

History
The first flight to the new airport was on 6 October 2005 with a flight from Sal. Even though the airport serves the capital and largest city, Praia as well as the island of Santiago, Cape Verde's busiest international airport is Amílcar Cabral International Airport located on the smaller island of Sal.

In January 2012 a Cape Verde government statement noted that Praia International Airport was renamed after South Africa's former president Nelson Mandela, an icon for freedom in Africa, not without controversy. Modernization works, including a new departures hall, were scheduled for completion in July 2018.

Airlines and destinations

Statistics

See also
List of buildings and structures in Santiago, Cape Verde

References

External links

Aeroporto da Praia, ASA
 TACV Timetable for Praia

Airports in Cape Verde
Praia
Transport in Santiago, Cape Verde
Airports established in 2005
2005 establishments in Cape Verde